Phi Octantis, Latinized from φ Octantis, is a solitary star in the southern circumpolar constellation Octans. It has an apparent magnitude of 5.46, making it faintly visible to the naked eye if viewed under ideal conditions.

Phi Octantis has a stellar classification of A0 V, making it an ordinary A-type main-sequence star. At present it has 2.7 times the mass of the Sun and 1.74 times the radius of the Sun.

References

Octans
A-type main-sequence stars
Octantis, Phi
Octantis, 33
Durchmusterung objects
167468
090133
6829